Kaulig Racing is an American professional stock car racing team that competes in the NASCAR Cup Series and NASCAR Xfinity Series. The team is owned by Matt Kaulig, an owner of team sponsor LeafFilter. Kaulig Racing fields three Cup Series Chevrolet Camaro ZL1 teams: the No. 13 part-time for Chandler Smith, the No. 16 full-time for A. J. Allmendinger, and the No. 31 full-time for Justin Haley. It also fields three full-time Xfinity Chevrolet Camaro teams: the No. 10 for multiple drivers, the No. 11 for Daniel Hemric, and the No. 16 for Chandler Smith. The team has a technical alliance with Richard Childress Racing, and formerly operated out of the NTS Motorsports facility.

Cup Series

Car No. 13 History
Part-time (2023)

Kaulig Racing announced that they will field a third car on a part-time basis with Xfinity driver Chandler Smith driving for five races starting with the Daytona 500 with sponsorship for that race coming from Quick Tie. Smith failed to make the Daytona 500 after finishing 18th in Duel 1 of the 2023 Bluegreen Vacations Duels.

On March 9, the team announced dirt racer Jonathan Davenport would be driving the entry at the Food City Dirt Race.

Car No. 13 results

Car No. 16 history
Part Time (2020-2021)

On January 10, 2020, Kaulig Racing announced they would make their NASCAR Cup Series debut at the Daytona 500, fielding the No. 16 for Justin Haley. The Fraternal Order of Eagles would sponsor Haley's entry. On February 8, Kaulig announced the team was looking to do more races in 2020. The next day, Haley made the field by posting the fastest qualifying speed of all the non-charter teams (190.018 mph; 31st overall). After failing to run more Cup races in 2020 in the wake of the COVID-19 pandemic, the team announced plans during the offseason to run the superspeedways and road course races in 2021. On January 13, 2021, it was announced that Kaz Grala would attempt to qualify for the Daytona 500 in the No. 16 car for Kaulig. Grala also attempted the GEICO 500 at Talladega, finishing a career best 6th place. A. J. Allmendinger returned to Cup by racing at the Daytona RC, then Circuit of the Americas.

On April 28, 2021, Matt Kaulig announced on SiriusXM Radio that Kaulig Racing would race full-time in the NASCAR Cup Series in the 2022 season. On June 18, the team announced that it purchased two charters from Spire Motorsports and will have Haley drive full-time in 2022. On August 15, Allmendinger gave Kaulig Racing their first Cup Series win at the Indianapolis road course in only the team's seventh Cup Series start. At the 2021 Coke Zero Sugar 400 at Daytona, Grala suffered a foot injury from one of the race's accidents.

Daniel Hemric, A.J Allmendinger & Noah Gragson (2022)
On December 14, 2021, Kaulig Racing announced the 2022 lineup for the No. 16, with Daniel Hemric and Noah Gragson joining the previously announced A. J. Allmendinger. Hemric is to run 8 races, Gragson will run 14, and Allmendinger will run 16 including the Clash and the All-Star Race.

On May 3, 2022, crew chief Matt Swiderski was suspended for four races due to a tire and wheel loss at Dover. 

A.J Allmendinger (2023-)
On October 5, Kaulig Racing announced that Allmendinger would drive the No. 16 full-time in 2023, marking his first full-time Cup season since 2018.

Car No. 16 results

Car No. 31 history

Justin Haley (2022-present)
On June 18, 2021, when Justin Haley was announced to drive full-time for Kaulig Racing in 2022, the team announcement stated that he would pilot the No. 16, which was the number Kaulig used for its Cup Series races in 2020 and 2021. However, following the news that Kaulig's other chartered entry would use the No. 16, the team announced on December 15, 2021, that Haley would drive the No. 31 in 2022. Haley finished 23rd at the 2022 Daytona 500, but following the race, crew chief Trent Owens was suspended for four races due to a tire and wheel loss during the race. On May 17, Owens was once again suspended for four races due to a tire and wheel loss during the 2022 AdventHealth 400 at Kansas.

Haley began the 2023 season with a 32nd place finish at the 2023 Daytona 500. On March 15, the No. 31 was served an L2 penalty after unapproved hood louvers were found installed on the car during pre-race inspection at Phoenix; as a result, the team was docked 100 driver and owner points and 10 playoff points. In addition, Owens was suspended for four races and fined 100,000.

Car No. 31 results

Xfinity Series

Car No. 10 history

Part Time (2018-2019)

In 2018, Austin Dillon drove the 10 Car for 1 race, that being at the Indianapolis Motor Speedway. He would finish 8th in the race.
On January 31, 2019, Kaulig Racing announced that Ross Chastain would drive the No. 10 car for three races from Daytona, Chicagoland, and Texas. Dillon returned to the team for the Las Vegas spring race, while Elliott Sadler, who had retired from full-time racing after the 2018 season, drove the No. 10 at Richmond and the fall Vegas event. A. J. Allmendinger joined the team on March 21 for a five-race schedule at Daytona, Watkins Glen, Mid-Ohio, Road America, and the Charlotte Roval. At the 2019 Circle K Firecracker 250 at Daytona, Allmendinger finished third, but was disqualified after a post-race vacuum inspection revealed a discrepancy in his car's engine. Allmendinger was once again disqualified at the 2019 Zippo 200 at The Glen at Watkins Glen International on August 3, 2019, when his second-place finishing car was discovered to be too low on both rear corners during post-race inspection. He held off Tyler Reddick to win at the Charlotte Roval, scoring Kaulig Racing's second win of the season. Days prior to the Kansas race, the No. 10's hauler lost control on a North Carolina highway and crashed, leaving the hauler's drivers injured and the race car damaged.

Ross Chastain (2020)
The team would run full-time in 2020 with Alex Yontz as crew chief. On October 15, 2019, it was announced that the driver, competing full-time for the Xfinity Series championship, would be Ross Chastain. It was also announced a month later that his replacement in 2021 would be Jeb Burton, moving over from JR Motorsports. Despite not winning a race and failing to qualify for the team at Daytona, Chastain finished a career-best 7th in the final standings in Kaulig's No. 10, including five runner-ups, and 27 top-tens (the most out of all drivers that season). Chastain would depart from the team and series after 2020 to replace Matt Kenseth in Chip Ganassi Racing's No. 42 Cup car in 2021. Jeb Burton would replace him for the 2021 season.

Jeb Burton (2021)
On April 24, 2021, Burton recorded his first career victory at Talledega after taking the lead from his cousin Harrison Burton in lap 82 and staying in front with 23 laps left after a caution caused by a seven-car wreck before NASCAR called the race finished due to heavy rain. It was also the second career victory for Kaulig's No. 10. Despite this, Kaulig Racing confirmed on September 21 that Burton's primary sponsor Nutrien Ag Solutions would depart from the team after the season and leave NASCAR entirely amid executive changes at the company. On October 11, Burton announced that he would not return to Kaulig Racing in 2022. He finished 11th in the final standings.

Landon Cassill (2022)
On December 9, 2021, Kaulig Racing announced Landon Cassill as Burton's replacement in the No. 10, with Cassill moving over from JD Motorsports alongside sponsor Voyager Digital, which signed a two-year extension with Cassill after beginning to sponsor him in 2021. 

Multiple Drivers (2023-Present)
On January 18, 2023, Cassill announced he would not return to the No. 10 full-time for 2023 as a result of his sponsor Voyager Digital filing for bankruptcy in July 2022. Kaulig has since announced the No. 10 entries will be an "All Star Car" with cup drivers. So far, Kaulig Cup drivers Justin Haley and A. J. Allmendinger as well as affiliate driver Austin Dillon have been announced as drivers. Kyle Busch will be piloting the car for the spring Las Vegas Motor Speedway race on March 4.

Car No. 10 results

Car No. 11 history

Blake Koch (2016-2017)
In June 2015, Blake Koch announced he and longtime sponsor LeafFilter Gutter Protection would re-sign with TriStar Motorsports for the 2016 season. However, in the 2015 offseason, LeafFilter owner Matt Kaulig decided to start his own team, Kaulig Racing. He brought along Koch, who he had sponsored the past two seasons, to pilot the No. 11 Chevy. Longtime NASCAR crew chief Chris Rice was hired as the team's general manager and crew chief. Kaulig Racing formed a technical alliance with Richard Childress Racing for the 2016 season. The team also used the owner's points of TriStar's former No. 8 team. In the team's debut, they finished 9th at Daytona after a strong showing, followed by a 20th-place finish at Atlanta the following week. For the team's third race Koch was running solidly in the top 15 before mechanical problems regulated him to a 26th-place finish six laps down. At Fontana, Koch finished 12th and on the lead lap, after running in the top 10 for much of the day. The team would later have several top-10 and top-15 runs, enough to get into the new Xfinity Chase, and also made to the 2nd round as well, but was unable to get to the final round, as he missed out by 7 points after finishing a strong 8th after running in or near the Top 5 all day. Blake finished 7th in the points, a Career best for Koch and Kaulig. 

Ryan Truex (2018)
On January 9, 2018, Kaulig Racing announced that they parted ways with Koch and had signed Camping World Truck Series driver Ryan Truex to drive the No. 11. Truex finished 7th in his team's debut. Truex was also very mediocre, having only 1 top 5 all year long and an average finish of 14.0.

Justin Haley (2019-2021)
After the 2018 season, the team announced on December 1, 2018, that Truex would be replaced by NASCAR Truck series title contender Justin Haley, who would compete for Sunoco Rookie of the Year honors in 2019. Haley would finish 12th in the points standings in 2019, but the next year scored 3 wins at both Talladega races and the summer Daytona race and wound up making the Final 4 round of the playoffs, finishing a team-best third in the points standings. Haley was in October 2020 confirmed to drive the car again in 2021. In his third year driving for Kaulig, Haley won the summer Daytona race and advanced to the Round of 8 in the playoffs, though a DNF in the cutoff race at Martinsville prevented Haley from reaching the Final 4. 

Daniel Hemric (2022-)
With Kaulig Racing expanding to the Cup Series full-time with a two car team and Haley as one of its drivers, on September 25, 2021, Daniel Hemric (who would later win the series championship) was announced to pilot the No. 11 in 2022.

Car No. 11 results

Car No. 14 history 

Justin Haley (2022)
On August 8, 2022, Kaulig Racing announced that Justin Haley would make his Xfinity Series return at Daytona in a newly established No. 14 car sponsored by DaaBin Store. Haley was upfront for most of the race but finished 25th after wrecking out late during an overtime attempt.

Car No. 14 results

Car No. 16 history

Ross Chastain (2019) 
On June 27, 2019, Kaulig announced Ross Chastain would drive a third car, the No. 16, at the 2019 Circle K Firecracker 250 at Daytona. After a grueling race at Daytona, Chastain led 49 laps, won stage one, and later went on to score Kaulig Racing's first win.  

A. J. Allmendinger (2020–2022)
It was announced in early 2020 that A. J. Allmendinger will drive the No. 16 on a part time basis starting at Daytona, in which he DNQ'd. Allmendinger won at Atlanta for the team, giving Kaulig Racing their third career win and their second with Allmendinger. Allmendinger would go on to win again that season at the Charlotte Roval for a second year in a row. On December 1, 2020, Kaulig announced Allmendinger would drive the No. 16 on a full-time basis for the 2021 Xfinity season.

In his first full-time season with Kaulig, Allmendinger scored wins at Las Vegas, Mid-Ohio, Michigan, and Bristol and stayed consistent enough to clinch the Regular Season Championship. During the playoffs, Allmendinger won at the Charlotte Roval for Kaulig a third consecutive time, and made the Championship 4, finishing 4th in the final standings.

Allmendinger started the 2022 season with a second-place finish at Daytona. He racked up wins at Citcuit of the Americas, Portland, Indianapolis and Talladega, and stayed consistent enough to win his second consecutive Regular Season Championship. During the playoffs, Allmendinger would win back-to-back races at Talladega and the Charlotte Roval, making it four straight victories at the latter. However, subpar finishes at Las Vegas and Martinsville eliminated Allmendinger from competing for the Xfinity Championship at Phoenix. Allmendinger would finish 5th in the points standings.

Chandler Smith (2023-)
On October 5, 2022, Kaulig Racing announced that Chandler Smith would replace Allmendinger in the No. 16 in 2023, as Allmendinger would return to a full-time schedule in the Cup Series,

Car No. 16 results

References

External links
 
 

American auto racing teams
NASCAR teams